Acme Animation Factory is an educational art and graphics video game released by Sunsoft in November 1994 for the Super Nintendo Entertainment System.

Gameplay

The game is compatible with the Super NES Mouse in addition to the gamepad. The player is given a series of tools to create their own animated cartoons, using the Looney Tunes characters. The player can alter the graphics, music, and animation. When the cartoon has been created, it can be saved and replayed. Aside from that, card games such as Solitaire and Mix 'n' Match (a variation of the game Concentration) are playable.

Reception 

GamePro gave the game a positive review, saying that the variety of activities offered by the cart keeps the player engaged for long stretches. They also praised the graphics and the efficiency of the controls.

See also
The Bugs Bunny Cartoon Workshop
Tiny Toon Adventures Cartoon Workshop

References

External links

1994 video games
Children's educational video games
Drawing video games
Filmmaking video games
Single-player video games
Sunsoft games
Super Nintendo Entertainment System games
Super Nintendo Entertainment System-only games
Video games featuring Bugs Bunny
Video games featuring Daffy Duck
Video games featuring Sylvester the Cat
Video games featuring the Tasmanian Devil (Looney Tunes)
Video games developed in the United Kingdom
Warner Bros. video games